Kenneth Lawrie (born 31 July 1951) is a former Scotland international rugby union player. He played at hooker.

Rugby Union career

Amateur career

He played for Gala.

Provincial career

He played for South of Scotland.

International career

He was capped 3 times by Scotland 'B', from 1978 to 1980. His first 'B' cap came against France 'B' on 19 March 1978.

He was capped 3 times by Scotland, all of the caps coming in 1980.

He went on the 1981 Scotland rugby union tour of New Zealand.

References

1951 births
Scotland 'B' international rugby union players
Scotland international rugby union players
Scottish rugby union players
South of Scotland District (rugby union) players
Gala RFC players
Living people